Manisha Girotra (born 1969) is an Indian business executive. Technology services firm Mindtree had appointed Manisha Girotra, the India CEO of a leading global independent investment bank, to its board of directors. Girotra is a graduate of the Delhi School of Economics. She is the country head of India for Moelis & Company.(CEO Of India)

Manisha Girotra is Chief Executive Officer of Moelis India. Girotra was most recently CEO and Country Head of UBS in India managing its investment bank, commercial bank, markets, equity research and wealth management divisions. Previously, Girotra was Head – North India of Barclays Bank. Girotra began her investment banking career in London in the corporate bank at ANZ Grindlays. She was honored as a Young Global Leader in 2010 by the World Economic Forum and was named one of the “15 Women to Watch in Asia” by Forbes in 2008 and one of the “50 Women to Watch” in the annual Wall Street Journal survey in 2007. Girotra has appeared in Business Today's “25 Most Powerful Women in Business in India” for the past five years as well as Fortune India's “50 Most Powerful Women in Business” in 2014. Girotra holds a degree from St. Stephen's College, Delhi and received a gold medal for her master's degree from the Delhi School of Economics.

References

Delhi School of Economics alumni
Indian women chief executives
Indian investment bankers
Living people
1969 births
Punjabi people
Indian chief executives